Noorden is a village in the Dutch province of South Holland. It is a part of the municipality of Nieuwkoop, and lies about 10 km north of Woerden.

In 2001, the town of Noorden had 975 inhabitants. The built-up area of the town was 0.18 km², and contained 337 residences.
The statistical area "Noorden", which also can include the peripheral parts of the village, as well as the surrounding countryside, has a population of around 1590.

Photos

References

External links
Pictures of Noorden

Populated places in South Holland
Geography of Nieuwkoop